Deborah Elizabeth Vavasseur Barnes (born 6 October 1956), known since her marriage as Deborah Barnes-Jones, is a British diplomat and administrator.

Career
Barnes joined the Foreign and Commonwealth Office in 1980. She was posted to the British Embassy in Moscow between 1983 and 1985, when she was promoted to First Secretary and was seconded to the Cabinet Office, remaining there until 1986. From 1988 to 1992 she was posted as First Secretary (Chancery) to the embassy in Tel Aviv, Israel, then returned to the Foreign Office in London for four years. She was Deputy Head of Mission in Uruguay from 1996 to 2001, when she was appointed as the British ambassador to the Republic of Georgia.

In 2004 Barnes-Jones was appointed as the Governor of Montserrat and was sworn in at a special session of the island's Legislative Council held in Brades on 10 May 2004, becoming the first female governor appointed by a reigning British monarch to a British Overseas Territory. She remained in post until 6 July 2007.

In 1986, she married Fredrick Richard Jones, an American diplomat, and they have twin daughters (Jennifer and Hilary), born in 1991.

References

1956 births
Living people
Governors of Montserrat
British women ambassadors
Ambassadors of the United Kingdom to Georgia (country)